Douglas Hugh McClure (born 6 September 1964) is an English former professional footballer who played in the Football League as a defender.

References

1964 births
Living people
Footballers from Islington (district)
English footballers
Association football defenders
Queens Park Rangers F.C. players
Exeter City F.C. players
Torquay United F.C. players
Wimbledon F.C. players
Peterborough United F.C. players
Crewe Alexandra F.C. players
Wealdstone F.C. players
Enfield F.C. players
Fisher Athletic F.C. players
English Football League players
National League (English football) players